This list is of the Places of Scenic Beauty of Japan located within the Prefecture of Yamagata.

National Places of Scenic Beauty
As of 1 January 2020, eight Places have been designated at a national level; Landscape of Oku no Hosomichi is a serial designation spanning twelve prefectures.

Prefectural Places of Scenic Beauty
As of 1 May 2019, two Places have been designated at a prefectural level.

Municipal Places of Scenic Beauty
As of 1 May 2019, ten Places have been designated at a municipal level, including:

See also
 Cultural Properties of Japan
 List of Historic Sites of Japan (Yamagata)
 List of parks and gardens of Yamagata Prefecture

References

External links
  Cultural Properties of Yamagata Prefecture

Tourist attractions in Yamagata Prefecture
Places of Scenic Beauty